Judith Wason is a Welsh  international lawn bowler .

Bowls career
She was first capped by Wales in 1991 and in 1995 she won the triples silver medal at the Atlantic Bowls Championships.

She won a bronze medal in the triples at the 1996 World Outdoor Bowls Championship in Leamington Spa with Ann Sutherland and Betty Morgan. She also competed in the Commonwealth games during 1998.

In 2012, she won the Hong Kong International Bowls Classic pairs title with Kelly Packwood.

After her 2015 Welsh National Bowls Championships singles success she subsequently won the singles at the British Isles Bowls Championships in 2016. She had previously won the Welsh National singles title in 1994.

Personal life
She is married to Welsh bowler Andrew Wason.

References

Welsh female bowls players
Welsh sportswomen
1962 births
Bowls players at the 1998 Commonwealth Games
Living people
Commonwealth Games competitors for Wales
Bowls European Champions